Kathleen Troia McFarland (born Kathleen M. Troia; July 22, 1951) is an American political candidate, former government official, and political commentator. She served as Deputy National Security Advisor under Michael Flynn for the first four months of the Trump administration. She was asked to step down by Flynn's successor H. R. McMaster; news of her pending nomination as U.S. Ambassador to Singapore was reported at the same time. President Trump nominated her in May 2017; she withdrew it in February 2018 due to concerns around her answers related to links between Trump associates and Russian officials, in particular about discussions between Flynn and Russian ambassador Sergey Kislyak.

McFarland began her political career in the 1970s as a night-shift typist and assistant press liaison for National Security Council staff. In the 1980s, she worked in the Department of Defense as a speechwriter and Deputy Assistant Secretary of Defense for Public Affairs. She ran unsuccessfully for the Republican nomination for the 2006 U.S. Senate election in New York. She frequently appears on Fox News and has written three books.

Early life and education 
Kathleen Troia was born on July 22, 1951, in Madison, Wisconsin, where she grew up as the oldest of four siblings. Her father was a train dispatcher for the Chicago and Northwestern Railroad.

She later said that her father had persistent rage issues and that she was beaten at least twice a month between the age of 2 and 12. "I had one of the most difficult childhoods imaginable. I was beaten up, I was whipped with a belt, I was kicked, I was shoved, and my father took a gun to us on a couple of occasions at a very young age". She said she avoided further beatings by staying away from home as much as possible and leaving home at the age of 18. In 2006, her father emphatically denied any such behavior; in response, she stood by her statements but requested "privacy for a family that I love and forgave many years ago". She later said that Disney heroines helped her overcome obstacles and inspired her to believe that women could achieve whatever they wanted.

Troia graduated from Madison West High School in 1969.

Troia studied at the Elliott School of International Affairs of the George Washington University in Washington, D.C. In 1970 she worked part-time at the Nixon White House for Henry Kissinger's National Security Council staff. She was on the nighttime typing pool, which meant that she typed the President's Daily Brief. Intrigued by U.S. foreign policy and Nixon's 1972 China visit, Troia majored in Chinese studies, and graduated from George Washington in 1973.

Career 

She continued to work in the White House during the Ford administration as a research assistant and at times assisted or filled in for the NSC press liaison. She is sometimes considered a Kissinger protégée. In December 1975, an Associated Press story quoted the 24-year Troia extolling Secretary of State Kissinger in keeping the world's image of the United States strong during the Nixon impeachment.

After working in the Ford administration, with a desire to be "taken really seriously", Troia studied on scholarship at Oxford University, where she earned a combined bachelor's degree in Politics, Philosophy, and Economics, and was later conferred a master's as is convention at Oxford.

Troia attended the Massachusetts Institute of Technology, where she studied nuclear weapons, China, and the Soviet Union for three years toward a Ph.D., but ended up as an "all but dissertation" case. The title of her unfinished thesis was "The Sino-Soviet nuclear confrontation of 1969 from the point of view of the Herman Kahn stepladder period of escalation". A second thesis attempt may have been entitled "The President's Strategic Defense Initiative".

She returned to Washington, D.C., in 1981 following the election of Ronald Reagan as president and the new Republican majority in the U.S. Senate and became a member of the Senate Armed Services Committee staff, working for chair John Tower. There she worked on the preparation of committee briefings and talking points.

Reagan administration
In the Reagan administration, when she was known informally as Kathy Troia, she started working as speechwriter for U.S. Secretary of Defense Caspar Weinberger in March 1982. Specifically, she worked on his "Six Tests for the Use of U.S. Military Power" speech, sometimes considered a forerunner of the Powell Doctrine.

Speechwriting was a significant activity in the Reagan administration because it forced a decision to be reached among battling factions, sometimes with the president intervening to settle a policy matter. Similar battles took place within the Pentagon, and she said that speeches were used to "short-circuit layers and layers of conflicting interests" in the defense bureaucracy. She likened the particular process she and Weinberger used to the traditional negative response model of the Book of the Month Club: "We'd send out the speech draft with a note saying that if we haven't heard from you by a certain day, we'll assume you agree. The responses were quick and usually on the major issues."

In December 1983 she was promoted to Principal Deputy to Michael I. Birch, the Assistant Secretary of Defense for Public Affairs. She later served as Pentagon spokesperson, with newspaper articles from that time describing her as a "senior Pentagon spokeswoman". She was reportedly under consideration for the Assistant Secretary position. She stayed in this position until around November 1984.

2006 Senate campaign

In 2006, McFarland ran in the Republican primary in the United States Senate election in New York for a seat held by Democrat Hillary Clinton. She was a late entrant – not forming an exploratory committee until March 2006 – who was recruited once the leading Republican, Westchester County District Attorney Jeanine Pirro, saw her candidacy implode.

McFarland had considered a congressional race to challenge Democratic incumbent Carolyn Maloney of Manhattan, but demurred on the grounds that she was unlikely to succeed. Nonetheless, she wanted to make a point by running as a Republican in New York, saying: "I spent 20 years of my life fighting against single party rule. It was called the Soviet Union and Communism then. But we are now allowing our system in the United States to have single party rule in many states. I am worried that we are dividing into Blue States where the Republicans don't run and Red States where Democrats don't run. That's counter to the whole concept of the United States as a place for competitive debates and competitive elections".

In the Republican nomination race for Senate, McFarland described herself both as a "moderate Republican" and a "Reagan Republican". She was pro-choice. She ran into trouble with a March 2006 comment that appeared to allege that the Clinton campaign had been flying helicopters low over her Southampton, New York, house and spying on her, or that Clinton forces had rented an apartment across from her $18 million duplex on Park Avenue; she later said she had been joking, but the episodes upset her. In May, McFarland's campaign manager Ed Rollins made a variety of coarse personal remarks against her opponent, former Yonkers Mayor John Spencer. All in all, the contest between Spencer and McFarland started ugly and got uglier.

McFarland's candidacy was plagued by media and other allegations that she overstated her credentials. The New York Times reported that McFarland's claim that she had written part of Ronald Reagan's "Star Wars" speech was false and had actually been written by Reagan's "top national security advisers", which did not include McFarland. Regarding her being the highest-ranking woman of her time at the Reagan Pentagon, the newspaper reported that this was also false and that two women at the Pentagon at the time held higher ranks. Also at issue was her claim that she had been the first female professional staff member of the Senate Armed Services Committee, which she had not been. Finally, the Spencer campaign objected to her assertion that she had held a civilian rank equivalent to that of a three-star general.

Her inconsistent record of voting in prior New York state elections also became an issue, with her having missed 6 of the last 14 votes. To this charge she responded at the time that she had no excuses, and later conceded that the "realities of family life took precedence". She maintained voting addresses in two different places at the same time, Manhattan and Southampton, sometimes voting in one and sometimes in the other, which was a possible felony under state law. In response, her lawyer conceded that what she did was in violation of election law but said: "there was no criminal intent, no venality here ... This is a case of the boards of elections not doing their jobs ... She should have been turned away". She emphasized that she had never voted twice and promised to cancel the Southampton registration. Troubled by these disclosures, as well as issues in her personal life, by late June her campaign was just about out of money. She then loaned her campaign $100,000 of her own money. On August 22, McFarland announced that she would be suspending her campaign until further notice after her daughter was caught shoplifting in Southampton.

In the September 12 primary, McFarland was defeated by Spencer 61% to 39%, amid historically low turnout. Despite her loss, her campaign manager Ed Rollins praised her for "a good fundraising effort" and being "a tireless candidate". Spencer went on to lose 31% to Clinton's 67% in the November general election.

Political commentator 

In 2010, McFarland regularly appeared on Fox News as a commentator, wrote a weekly column on FoxNews.com, and hosted an online talk show called Defcon 3, a reference to DEFCON, the United States' defense readiness scale. She also appeared regularly on Fox News Radio, ABC Radio, WMAL, and WVOX.

In this role, McFarland was highly critical of President Obama's approach to combating terrorism, saying he failed to acknowledge the threat that "global Islamist jihad" posed to "Western Civilization". After the ISIL beheading incidents in 2014, she said Obama had "stuck his head in the sand" and said it was a "dereliction of duty" for "playing a lot of golf".

On the U.S. diplomatic cables leak, McFarland called Julian Assange a terrorist, WikiLeaks "a terrorist organization", and called for the death penalty for Chelsea Manning (whom she referred to as Bradley Manning) if the soldier was found guilty of making the leaks. On waterboarding, she said, "It's not torture, but even if it is torture, it's worth doing".

As a commentator, McFarland often expressed doubts about globalism and the value of U.S. interventions abroad. Regarding the 2011 military intervention in Libya, she characterized it as "insane". In 2016, she applauded the Brexit vote in approval of withdrawal from the European Union. In other cases she advocated for either strong action or none at all: "Either bomb Iran, or let Iran get the bomb." She dismissed putative Saudi support for the Iranian nuclear agreement, saying "they are Arabs, they are not going to say something to your face that will upset you ... it's not what they say, it's what they do."

In 2013, McFarland wrote that Vladimir Putin deserved a Nobel Peace Prize for his actions during the Syrian Civil War. In 2014, following the annexation of Crimea, she tweeted, "Putin seizes countries, Obama threatens maybe to kick Russia out of the G-8 club. Bet Putin's sorry now! Winners write history, not whiners." She said the United States might be able to find "common ground" with Putin.

McFarland was a board member of The Jamestown Foundation from June 2008 until her appointment as Deputy National Security Advisor in 2017. She also served as a distinguished advisor to the Foundation for Defense of Democracies. She is a senior fellow at the American Conservative Union.

McFarland is the author of three books, Our Time is Now: Reclaiming an America We Can Believe In, Our Time is Now: Tough Love Diplomacy, Commonsense Economy, and the Second Great American Century, and Revolution: Trump, Washington and "We the People".

Trump administration

Transition

On November 25, 2016, it was reported that McFarland was selected as President-elect Donald Trump's Deputy National Security Advisor, a position that does not require Senate confirmation. McFarland had no existing relationship with Trump before his campaign but knew his two older sons from their appearances on Fox News, while he liked her appearances on that channel. It would represent McFarland's first government position in over 30 years. Following her selection, McFarland pulled down her website and expunged her public social media accounts.

The selection surprised some people given McFarland's length of time away from government and the fact that she had little experience with intense extra-hours positions and personnel and crisis management. However, her former boss Henry Kissinger praised the selection. Retired general Michael T. Flynn, who had been selected as President Trump's national security adviser, had ties to McFarland and tweeted a welcome to her. Hawk and former Senator Joe Lieberman also praised McFarland for being "one of our country's most experienced, informed and wise foreign policy and national security experts".

Deputy National Security Advisor
Once in office, McFarland's style annoyed some of the more non-political staffers on the NSC. She repeated the "Make America Great Again" mantra to career employees and mentioned that she was wearing shoes from the Ivanka Trump apparel line, giving other NSC staffers the impression she was too political.

On February 14, 2017, Flynn announced his resignation after he became embroiled in controversy regarding discussions he had with Russian officials, but one report quoted McFarland as intending to stay on, at Trump's request. Further reports indicated that a requirement for any replacement in the position was that McFarland be kept on as that person's number two, which was a disincentive for some potential nominees, including Vice Admiral Robert Harward. General H. R. McMaster was eventually named Flynn's replacement.

In mid-March 2017, Dina Habib Powell was named as another Deputy National Security Advisor, with an emphasis on strategy. According to Politico, the appointment had been "designed to effectively push out McFarland", who was "seen as a weak deputy". The increasing problems surrounding Flynn also made McFarland vulnerable due to the ties between the two.

On April 9, 2017, it was reported that McFarland had been asked to step down from her position after less than three months in the role but that she had been offered a position as the U.S. Ambassador to Singapore. McFarland said she viewed the move in a positive light, as a "promotion", and a White House official encouraged the interpretation. She would remain as Deputy National Security Advisor for some amount of time, although probably not all the way until her planned ambassadorial confirmation.

The shuffle was supposed to take place in a fortnight, but that intention did not work out, and after a month went by the shift had still not happened, reportedly pending McMaster's selection of a replacement for McFarland. McFarland continued to perform some duties during this time, such as meeting with the Prime Minister of Australia. She also gave Trump a known online hoax about mainstream media's supposed hypocrisy about climate change in respect to the 1970s global cooling conjecture. According to another report, McFarland was still favored by Trump, who did not understand why her departure was necessary.

Ambassadorial nomination and Special Counsel investigation

After Ricky L. Waddell was nominated to succeed her as Deputy National Security Advisor on May 10, 2017, she was officially announced as Trump's nominee for U.S. Ambassador to Singapore on May 19, 2017. Singapore-based newspaper The Straits Times noted that all U.S. Ambassadors to Singapore had been political appointees since 1986. On June 15, 2017, McFarland was formally nominated by the White House, and her confirmation hearing before the Senate Foreign Relations Committee took place on July 20, 2017, during which she described Singapore's importance with the real estate maxim "location, location, location". McFarland also stated that she believed Russia had interfered in the 2016 U.S. elections. On September 19, McFarland's confirmation was approved by the committee and was sent on to the full Senate, but as of the end of November her nomination was not scheduled for a vote in the full Senate.

On December 1, Robert Mueller's Special Counsel investigation named McFarland as one of the people involved with Michael Flynn, her former supervisor, and Jared Kushner in developments leading up to Flynn's guilty plea to lying to the Federal Bureau of Investigation. In particular, Kushner and McFarland reportedly briefed Flynn on what to say about U S. sanctions against Russia. The next day, an email McFarland wrote during the transition surfaced; it read: "If there is a tit-for-tat escalation Trump will have difficulty improving relations with Russia, which has just thrown U.S.A. election to him." After talking to Kislyak, Flynn informed McFarland of the contents of the conversation, who in turn passed on the information to one of her colleagues.

In response to these revelations, Senate Foreign Relations Committee ranking members Mark Warner and Dianne Feinstein suggested that she testify before Congress, Cory Booker questioned whether McFarland had been fully forthcoming in her previous testimony, and Committee Chair Bob Corker pronounced her nomination "frozen". By December 5, committee Democrats had placed a formal Senate hold on her nomination.

At the end of 2017, the U.S. Senate sent McFarland's nomination back to the White House rather than tabling it until 2018, along with other pending nominations. On January 10, 2018, the administration renominated McFarland.

On February 2, 2018, McFarland withdrew her nomination, writing "I have come to this decision reluctantly, because I believe in your mission" in her resignation letter to Trump. In response, Trump blamed the Democrats, noting that they "chose to play politics rather than move forward with a qualified nominee for a critically important post" even though Senate Republicans could have approved her nomination unilaterally given their majority, which suggests that some of them may have been hesitant to approve her.

In September 2018 it became known that she had indeed walked back her story to the special prosecutor. The FBI accepted McFarland's contention that she had not misstated factualities intentionally.

Awards and honors
In 1985, McFarland received the Department of Defense's highest civilian honor, the Distinguished Civilian Service Award.

At the 2015 CPAC meeting, the Clare Boothe Luce Policy Institute awarded McFarland its Woman of the Year award.

In November 2016, the American Conservative Union selected McFarland as its "Conservative in the Spotlight", with ACU chair Matt Schlapp calling her "not only a brilliant strategist with a wealth of global affairs knowledge, but ... also an expert communicator who knows how to effectively deliver clear and concise messages to grassroots activists".

Personal life 

Troia married Alan Roberts McFarland (born 1942) on January 12, 1985, at the National Cathedral in Washington, D.C. He was a general partner in Lazard Frères and went on to become a well-known investment banker.

In 1985, K. T. McFarland became a stay-at-home mother. The couple had three children together, along with two from his first marriage to whom she became stepmother. During the next two decades, McFarland says she "taught Sunday school, served as a class mother, directed school plays, headed a preschool library, and sang in the church choir". She and her husband joined a number of exclusive New York clubs and country clubs. Her youngest daughter attended the United States Naval Academy.

McFarland had two brothers, Tom and Michael. Michael died of an AIDS-related illness on June 8, 1995. Prior to his death, McFarland outed her brother as gay to her parents, blaming his homosexuality on family abuse and cutting off contact with her parents. In 2006, her surviving brother Tom Troia, in defense of their father, told the New York Post, "If I had one word to describe my sister, it would be 'evil'". ''

In 2000, McFarland started doing some work for the Foreign Policy Association, booking speakers for ladies' lunches. She is a life member of the Council on Foreign Relations.

References

External links

 NSC page
 Ambassadorial nomination record of stages in Congress
 
 Kathleen Troia “KT” McFarland - Board member biography, Jamestown Foundation. Archived from the original on September 23, 2016.
 IMDb entry
 Website - archived as of October 2016
 On National Security and Islamic Terrorism  - with Gen. Jerry Boykin

1951 births
21st-century American women
Alumni of St Anne's College, Oxford
American commentators
American people of Italian descent
American speechwriters
American women civil servants
Candidates in the 2006 United States elections
Elliott School of International Affairs alumni
Ford administration personnel
Fox News people
Living people
Madison West High School alumni
New York (state) Republicans
Nixon administration personnel
Politicians from Madison, Wisconsin
Politicians from Manhattan
People from Southampton (town), New York
Reagan administration personnel
Trump administration personnel
United States Department of Defense officials
United States Deputy National Security Advisors
Women in New York (state) politics